Group C of the 2013 Fed Cup Europe/Africa Zone Group III was one of four pools in the Europe/Africa Zone Group III of the 2013 Fed Cup. Three teams competed in a round robin competition, with the top team and the bottom two teams proceeding to their respective sections of the play-offs: the top team played for advancement to Group II.

Standings

Round-robin

Moldova vs. Kenya

Ireland vs. Kenya

Ireland vs. Moldova

See also
Fed Cup structure

References

External links
 Fed Cup website

2013 Fed Cup Europe/Africa Zone